Manana Antadze (Georgian: მანანა ანთაძე, born August 28, 1945) is a Georgian writer and translator, and founder of the Tumanishvili Theatre Foundation.

Life and career 
In 1967 Manana Antadze graduated from Tbilisi State University (TSU), Western European Languages and Literature.

From 1981 to 1989, Antadze was a research associate at the Centre for Contemporary Literary Studies at the Georgian State University. She has been a freelance translator since 1974, and her numerous translations include William Shakespeare's Macbeth, Irving Stone's Lust for Life, and J. K. Rowling's Harry Potter and the Philosopher's Stone.

In 2006, Antadze presented the annual awards given for "New Writing" in "New Georgian play" and "The Best Translation". In July 2009. she attended the 31st Cambridge Seminar on Contemporary Literature, then, in August she attended Globe Education Cultural Seminar on "Shakespeare & His Stage".

Antadze's biography is included in Who is Who in Georgia (2009).

Work experience 

 1971–present, Freelance translator
 1981-1989, Center for Contemporary Western Literary Studies, TSU (research associate)
 1981–present, Tumanishvili Film Actors’ Theatre (Literary manager)
 1998–present, Tumanishvili Theatre Foundation (Founder and President)
 2006–present, Legal Leader of International Drama Competition ‘NEW WRITING IN GEORGIA’
 2012–present, Sturua Productions/Founder with Robert Sturua and Gia Tevzadze

Education and training 
 1962-1967, MA/BA Tbilisi State University (TSU), Western European Languages and Literature
 2009, 31st Cambridge Seminar "Contemporary Literature" (alumna)
 2009, Globe Education Cultural Seminar "Shakespaere and his Stage" (alumna)

Memberships 
 Inner Wheel (Rotary) Club 
 Eurodram 
 Georgian Writers’ Union 
 Georgian Theatre Craftsmen’ Union

Works

Publications 
 1989, "Edward Albee: Existential Intuition" in Modern Western Drama, with I. Gogoberidze and L. Kereselidze

Translations staged (in Georgian) 

 1978 – Eugene O’Neill, Desire Under The Elms, director Temur Chkheidze
 1980 – William Gibson, The Cry Of Players, director Andro Enukidze
 1981 – Moliere, Dom Juan, director Mikheil Tumanishvili
 1982 – Rudyard  Kipling, The Cat That Walked By Himself, director Nana Demetrashvili
 2004 – Dario Fo, The Open Couple, director Keti Dolidze
 2005 – Anton Chekhov, The Cherry Orchard, director Gogi Margvelashvili
 2006 – George S. Kaufman & Edna Ferber, The Royal Family, director Keti Dolidze
 2007 – Nikolai Gogol, Revisor (Inspector), director Otar Egadze
 2007 – Bertolt Brecht, Mother Courage, commissioned by David Doiashvili
 2009 – William Shakespeare, Macbeth, director David Doiashvili
 2010 – Edmond Rostand, Cyrano De Bergerac, director David Doiashvili
 2010 – David Hastings, One Small Step, commissioned by British Council Georgia
 2012 – Terrence McNally, Masterclass, director Robert Sturua
 2014 – Maxim Gorky, The Lower Depths, director David Doiashvili
 2015 – William Shakespeare, Julius Caesar, commissioned by Robert Sturua
 2015 – William Shakespeare, King Lear, director Zurab Getsadze
 2015 – Tennessee Williams, A Streetcar Named Desire, director Keti Dolidze

Translations published 

 1971 – Irving Stone, Lust For Life
 1978 – H. G. Wells, Russia in the Shadows
 1979 – Eugene O'Neill, Desire Under The Elms
 2002 – J. K. Rowling, Harry Potter and the Philosopher's Stone, 
 2009 – Tennessee Williams, Camino Real, 
 2012 – Terrence McNally, Masterclass, 
 2014 – Anton Chekhov, The Cherry Orchard, 
 2014 – Moliere, Dom Juan, 
 2014 – Edmond Rostand, Cyrano De Bergerac, 
 2014 – William Shakespeare, Macbeth,

Honors and awards 
 2002 – Honorary Citizen of Domrémy-la-Pucelle, France.
 2015 – Ivane Machabeli Prise

References

External links 
 Interview with Manana Antadze by Mária Kiššová
 British Council wraps-up New Writing Development project
 Lust for Life
 Manana Antadze
 On Facebook
 au:Antadze, Manana.
 Edinburgh Festival Day 12: Well-rehearsed arguments: The Georgian Film Actors are unpredictable – in every sense. Sarah Hemming tries to keep up

1945 births
Writers from Tbilisi
Living people
Translators from Georgia (country)
Tbilisi State University alumni
20th-century writers from Georgia (country)
21st-century writers from Georgia (country)
20th-century women writers from Georgia (country)
21st-century women writers from Georgia (country)